The 1977 Australia Day Honours were announced on 26 January 1977 by the Governor General of Australia, Sir John Kerr.

The Australia Day Honours are the first of the two major annual honours lists, announced on Australia Day (26 January), with the other being the Queen's Birthday Honours which are announced on the second Monday in June.

Order of Australia

Companion (AC)

Officer (AO)

General Division

Military Division

Member (AM)

General Division

Military Division

Medal (OAM)

General Division

Military Division

References

1977 awards
Orders, decorations, and medals of Australia
1977 in Australia